is a railway station on the Ban'etsu West Line in the city of  Kōriyama, Fukushima Prefecture, Japan, operated by East Japan Railway Company (JR East).

Lines

Station layout
Akogashima Station has two opposed side platforms connected to the station building by a footbridge. The station is unattended.

Platforms

History
Akogashima Station opened on July 26, 1898.  The station was absorbed into the JR East network upon the privatization of the Japanese National Railways (JNR) on April 1, 1987.

Surrounding area

 Akogashima Post Office

See also
 List of Railway Stations in Japan

References

External links

 ] 

Stations of East Japan Railway Company
Railway stations in Fukushima Prefecture
Ban'etsu West Line
Railway stations in Japan opened in 1898
Kōriyama